Torona is an extinct Niger–Congo language of Kordofan, Sudan. Speakers have shifted to Tira. a description of Torona can be found in Norton & Alaki (2016).

References

Sources
Norton, Russell and Thomas Kuku Alaki. 2016. Torona: a disappearing Talodi language of Sudan. In Gratien G. Atindogbe and Evelyn Fogwe Chibaka (eds.), Proceedings of the Seventh World Congress of African Linguistics, Buea, 17-21 August 2012 (WOCAL-7), 152-177. Bamenda, Cameroon: Langaa.

Extinct languages of Africa
Talodi languages